Shane Karlarnee Young  (born 31 July 1993) is a New Zealand mixed martial artist (MMA) who currently competes in the Featherweight division in the Ultimate Fighting Championship (UFC).

Background 
Young was born in Napier, New Zealand, He trains at Auckland's City Kickboxing gym where he is the teammate of UFC fighters Israel Adesanya, Dan Hooker and Kai Kara-France.  Young is of European and Māori descent and is affiliated with the Māori tribe Ngāti Kahungunu. He uses fighting as the platform to inspire New Zealand mixed-blood Māori to accept their Māori roots and to be sporting stars.

Mixed martial arts career

Early career 
Young started his professional MMA career in 2012 and amassed a record of 11-3 before being signed by the UFC.

Ultimate Fighting Championship 
Young made his promotional debut as a short notice replacement against Alexander Volkanovski on 19 November 2017 at UFC Fight Night: Werdum vs. Tybura. The bout proceeded at a catchweight of 150 pounds. Young lost the fight via unanimous decision.

Young faced Rolando Dy on 23 June 2018 at UFC Fight Night: Cerrone vs. Edwards. He won the fight via technical knockout in round two. This win earned him the Fight of the Night award.

Young contemplated stepping away from fighting after his bout with Dy for the remainder of 2018 to tackle his depression after achieving the success and the fame at UFC Fight Night: Cerrone vs. Edwards of earning $50,000, where prior to the bout he had to borrow $40 to get to the airport for his flight to Singapore for the fight, and his mental health issues surrounding the break-up of his marriage where he spent most of the time with his family while seeking to reconnect with his Māori culture, which helped him to return to a healthy state of mind.

Young returned to fighting and he faced Austin Arnett on 10 February 2019 at UFC 234. He won the fight via unanimous decision.

Young was scheduled to face Nate Landwehr on 27 September 2020 at UFC 253. However Landwehr was pulled from the event due to tested positive for COVID-19 and he was replaced by newcomer Ľudovít Klein. At the weigh-ins, Klein weighed in at 150 pounds, four pounds over the non-title featherweight fight limit. The bout proceeded at a catchweight and Klein was fined a percentage of  his purse, which went to Young. Young lost the fight via knockout in round one.

Young faced Omar Morales on 27 March 2021 at UFC 260. He lost the fight via unanimous decision.

Young faced Blake Bilder on February 12, 2023, at UFC 284. He lost the fight via unanimous decision.

Championships and accomplishments

Mixed martial arts 

 Ultimate Fighting Championship
 Fight of the Night (One time)

Personal life 
Young was a builder and foreman prior to competing in MMA professionally.

Mixed martial arts record 

|-
|Loss
|align=center|13–7
|Blake Bilder
|Decision (unanimous)
|UFC 284
|
|align=center|3
|align=center|5:00
|Perth, Australia 
|
|-
|Loss
|align=center|13–6
|Omar Morales
|Decision (unanimous)
|UFC 260
|
|align=center|3
|align=center|5:00
|Las Vegas, Nevada, United States
|
|-
|Loss
|align=center|13–5
|Ľudovít Klein
|KO (head kick and punches)
|UFC 253
|
|align=center|1
|align=center|1:16
|Abu Dhabi, United Arab Emirates
|
|-
|Win
|align=center|13–4
|Austin Arnett
|Decision (unanimous)
|UFC 234
|
|align=center|3
|align=center|5:00
|Melbourne, Australia
|
|-
|Win
|align=center|12–4
|Rolando Dy
|TKO (punches)
|UFC Fight Night: Cowboy vs. Edwards
|
|align=center|2
|align=center|4:40
|Kallang, Singapore
|
|-
|Loss
|align=center|11–4
|Alexander Volkanovski
|Decision (unanimous)
|UFC Fight Night: Werdum vs. Tybura
|
|align=center|3
|align=center|5:00
|Sydney, Australia
|
|-
|Win
|align=center|11–3
|Bo Yan
|Submission (choke)
|WLF: W.A.R.S. 13
|
|align=center|1
|align=center|N/A
|Zhengzhou, China
|
|-
|Win
|align=center|10–3
|Zexian Jiang
|Technical Submission (rear-naked choke)
|Glory of Heroes: Rise of Heroes 7
|
|align=center|1
|align=center|5:00
|Auckland, New Zealand
|
|-
|Win
|align=center|9–3
|Siitia Leti
|Decision
|BRACE 43
|
|align=center|1
|align=center|0:36
|Canterbury, New Zealand
|
|-
|Win
|align=center|8–3
|Zhenhong Lu
|TKO (punches)
|Elevation Power in Cage 4
|
|align=center|1
|align=center|3:29
|Zhengzhou, China
|
|-
|Win
|align=center|7–3
|Rodolfo Marques
|Decision (split)
|Minotaur 3
|
|align=center|3
|align=center|5:00
|Parkville, Australia
|
|-
|loss
|align=center|6–3
|Guan Wang
|Decision (unanimous)
|Wu Lin Feng 2015: New Zealand vs. China
|
|align=center|3
|align=center|5:00
|Auckland, New Zealand
|
|-
|Win
|align=center|6–2
|Liucai Cui
|Submission (rear-naked choke)
|The Legend Of Emei 3
|
|align=center|1
|align=center|2:34
|Shahe, China
|
|-
|Win
|align=center|5–2
|Julian Wallace
|KO (punches)
|Xtreme Fighting Championship 24
|
|align=center|1
|align=center|1:16
|Brisbane, Australia
|
|-
|Loss
|align=center|4–2
|Damien Brown
|Decision (majority)
|Xtreme Fighting Championship 23
|
|align=center|3
|align=center|5:00
|Brisbane, Australia
|
|-
|Win
|align=center|4–1
|Adrian Rodriguez
|TKO (head kick and punches)
|Xtreme Fighting Championship 22
|
|align=center|3
|align=center|3:32
|Brisbane, Australia
|
|-
|Loss
|align=center|3–1
|Adrian Rodriguez
|Decision (majority)
|Xtreme Fighting Championship 20
|
|align=center|3
|align=center|5:00
|Brisbane, Australia
|
|-
|Win
|align=center|3–0
|Hayden Watt
|Decision (majority)
|Shuriken MMA: Rise
|
|align=center|3
|align=center|5:00
|Auckland, New Zealand
|
|-
|Win
|align=center|2–0
|Jiraya Fernandes
|TKO (punches)
|Jiraya Fernandes
|
|align=center|1
|align=center|4:50
|Wellington, New Zealand
|
|-
|Win
|align=center|1–0
|Ray Karaitiana
|TKO (punches)
|ICNZ 18
|
|align=center|1
|align=center|N/A
|Auckland, New Zealand
|
|-

See also 
 List of current UFC fighters
 List of male mixed martial artists

References

External links 

 
 

Living people
1993 births
Featherweight mixed martial artists
Mixed martial artists utilizing kickboxing
New Zealand Māori sportspeople
Ngāti Kahungunu people
New Zealand male mixed martial artists
Sportspeople from Auckland
Ultimate Fighting Championship male fighters